Brazès is a surname. Notable people with the surname include:

Edmond Brazès (1893–1980), French writer
Noël Brazès (1920–2010), French rugby union player

See also
Brazing